Kathryn McCormick (born 7 July 1990) is an American actress and dancer, noted for placing third in the sixth season of the American televised dance competition So You Think You Can Dance, in which she had the highest placement for a woman on the season. She has returned in seasons 7–13 as one of the show's "all-stars". Additionally, she placed third with fellow So You Think You Can Dance: The Next Generation contestant Tate McRae. She played a leading role in Step Up Revolution (2012), and in the film Dance-Off (2014) opposite Shane Harper.

Life and career
Kathryn started dancing at age three at her mother's studio, Dance Connection, then moved to Augusta West Studio, where her mother, Sandra Schmieden, had also studied. She moved to Los Angeles at the age of 18 and landed a non-leading role in the remake of Fame. McCormick has also been featured in the Jar of Hearts music video by Christina Perri. She performed on Dancing with the Stars on November 20, 2012 and April 7, 2014. She is featured as the female dancer in the music video "Dead Inside" by Muse. In 2015, Kathryn and her husband, Jacob Patrick, released their documentary Like Air. Kathryn wanted to bring light to the more optimistic side of competitive dance by showcasing her mentorship with three of her proteges from Dance Makers INC. The documentary focuses on McCormick's mentorship for three girls as they train for DanceMakers Nationals. She continues to tour with the dance convention and competition Dance Makers INC.

Filmography

References

External links
 
 

1990 births
21st-century American actresses
21st-century American dancers
American female dancers
American contemporary dancers
Living people
Actresses from Augusta, Georgia
So You Think You Can Dance (American TV series) contestants